Arthur Bruce Brown (March 17, 1911 – December 20, 1975) was a Canadian politician. He served in the Legislative Assembly of British Columbia from 1953 to 1956  from the electoral district of Prince Rupert, a member of the Liberal Party.  He stood for re-election in 1956 but was defeated by a candidate of the Social Credit party.

References

1911 births
1975 deaths
People from the Regional District of Kootenay Boundary
British Columbia Liberal Party MLAs